Margaret MacPherson may refer to:
 Margaret Macpherson Grant (1834–1877), Scottish heiress and philanthropist
 Margaret Campbell Macpherson (1860–1931), artist born in Canada, known for her work in Scotland
 Margaret MacPherson (pharmacist) (1875–1956), Australian pharmacist and benefactress
 Margaret MacPherson (writer) (1895–1974), New Zealand journalist and author
 Margaret MacPherson (activist) (1908–2001), Scottish crofter, politician and author